Don't Argue was an Australian television series which aired from 26 July to 13 December 1959 on Melbourne television station HSV-7. Broadcast at 4:00PM on Sundays, the half-hour series featured Alwyn Kurts and Judy Banks, and was broadcast live. The exact format is unclear, but it featured an audience participation format. It likely only aired in Melbourne.

Although kinescope recording was available during the run of the series, it is not known if any of the episodes were recorded using the technology. The survival rate of early HSV-7 series is highly unpredictable, with some series (like Hit Parade) having at least some extant episodes, while some series are lost.

References

External links
Don't Argue at IMDb

Seven Network original programming
1959 Australian television series debuts
1959 Australian television series endings
Australian live television series
Black-and-white Australian television shows
English-language television shows
Australian non-fiction television series